Alcohol laws of Maryland vary considerably by county, due to the wide latitude of home rule granted to Maryland counties.

State laws

Underage possession and consumption
It is illegal under state law for a person under the age of 21 to possess or consume an alcoholic beverage, but the law contains several exceptions:
 Underage individuals who are employees of businesses that hold a valid state-issued liquor license may possess (but not consume) alcohol in the course of their job during regular business hours.  Common examples are serving alcoholic drinks to customers of a restaurant, making deliveries for a catering company, and stocking shelves at a store that sells alcohol.
  Alcohol may be possessed or consumed by an underage person in a private residence so long as it is furnished or allowed by a member of that person's immediate family (typically a parent).
  Alcohol may be consumed as part of a religious ceremony, such as the Roman Catholic or Episcopal Communion rite.

It is a separate offense for an underage person to misrepresent age for the purpose of obtaining alcohol, or to possess any sort of card or document that falsely identifies the person's age.  An underage person who illegally possesses alcohol or false identification is subject to a citation rather than arrest, and the event is considered a civil offense, meaning that it does not count as a criminal conviction and cannot result in imprisonment in and of itself.  This is because the reason for the drinking age in the first place is that the law does not consider individuals under 21 to be responsible enough to consume alcohol unsupervised; therefore holding them fully criminally responsible would be paradoxical.

Furnishing alcohol to underage persons
Except for the specific exempt circumstances provided in Maryland law, it is also illegal for anyone to purchase alcohol for someone under 21, or to give it to them.  Maryland alcohol laws require that the defendant knew the person was under 21, and purchased or furnished alcohol for that underage person to consume.  In addition, it is also illegal for an adult who owns or leases property, and lives at that property, to knowingly and willfully allow anyone under 21 to consume alcohol there, unless they are members of the same immediate family.  This law does not necessarily make homeowners criminally responsible for any illegal drinking at their residence, unless they were both aware of it and intentionally allowed it to happen.

Employment
A person must be at least 21 years old to be employed to serve alcoholic beverages or sell alcoholic beverages, although some counties have different laws. A person must be at least 18 years old to work in another capacity at an establishment that serves alcohol.

Open containers
State law prohibits open containers with any amount of alcohol within the passenger area of a motor vehicle.  Passengers of a vehicle are similarly prohibited from consuming alcohol in the passenger area, but the law provides exceptions for non-drivers in the back of hired vehicles such as taxis, limousines, and buses, as well as in the living areas of motor homes.  The driver is also shielded from prosecution if it is based solely on another occupant of the vehicle having an open container.  This law only considers certain parts of a vehicle to be the "passenger area," and excludes locked glove compartment, trunks, and the area behind the rear-most seats if the vehicle has no trunk (such as those commonly found in vans and SUVs).  Like underage possession above, violation of the open container law is a civil offense.

Taxation
In July 2011, Maryland's taxation of alcohol was increased for the first time since the 1970s, from 6 percent to 9 percent. The tax is applied at the consumer level, appearing as a line-item on the customer's receipt.

County laws

History
Prior to 1973, the minimum age to buy or possess alcoholic beverages was 21 years old. In 1973, the minimum age was decreased to 18 years old in Montgomery County and Prince George's County. In 1974, the minimum age was decreased to 18 years old for the entire state. In 1982, the minimum age was increased to 21 years old but with a grandfather clause which allowed those who had already turned 18 (born June 30, 1964 or earlier) to consume beer and wine.

See also
 Drug policy of Maryland
 Montgomery County Department of Liquor Control

Notes

References

Maryland law
Maryland
Controlled substances in Maryland